Gołąbki  is the Polish name of a dish popular in cuisines of Central Europe, made from boiled cabbage leaves wrapped around a filling of minced pork or beef, chopped onions, and rice and/or kasza.

Gołąbki are often served during the Christmas season and on festive occasions such as weddings. They are also a featured dish for family reunions amongst Polish Americans. An alternative to the dish are Jewish holishkes, served on Sukkot and Simchat Torah.

Etymology
Max Vasmer accepts this as the origin of the word, stating that the dish was so named due to similarity in shape. The Polish linguist Marek Stachowski finds this theory semantically dubious. He instead proposes an Oriental borrowing, pointing out that a similar dish, aside from Eastern Europe, is known in the Levant and Central Asia. He mentions Persian   "cabbage" or   "cabbage roll" and Old Armenian   "cabbage" as possible sources. The word would have later been altered by folk etymology to resemble the word for the bird.

Other names

Gołąbki are also referred to in English as golombki, golumpki, golabki, golumpkies, golumpkis, gluntkes, or gwumpki. Similar variations are called holubky (Czech, Slovak), töltött káposzta (Hungarian), holubtsi (Ukrainian), golubtsy (Russian), balandėliai (Lithuanian), Kohlrouladen (German) or kåldolmar (Sweden, from the Turkish dolma). In Yiddish, holipshes, goleptzi golumpki and holishkes or holep'' are very similar dishes.

In the United States, the terms are commonly Anglicized by second- or third-generation Americans to "stuffed cabbage", "stuffed cabbage leaves", or "cabbage casserole".
They are also referred to as "pigs in a blanket", not to be confused with pigs in blankets in British and Irish cuisine.

See also
 List of cabbage dishes

References

External links
Gołąbki recipe from the Food Network
Straight outta da Coal Region kitchen!

European cuisine
Polish cuisine
Lithuanian cuisine
Ashkenazi Jewish cuisine
Stuffed vegetable dishes
Cabbage dishes
National dishes